Mylène Chavas (born 7 January 1998) is a French professional footballer who plays as a goalkeeper for Division 1 Féminine club Bordeaux and the France national team.

Club career
In June 2021, Chavas joined Bordeaux on a two-year deal.

International career
Chavas is a former French youth international. She was part of under-19 national team which won UEFA Women's Under-19 Championship in 2016. She was also under-20 team's starting goalkeeper at the 2016 FIFA U-20 Women's World Cup the same year. Despite her team's loss to North Korea in the final, she went on to win Golden Glove award for best goalkeeper in the tournament.

In May 2022, Chavas was included in France's squad for UEFA Women's Euro 2022. She made her senior team debut on 25 June 2022 in a 4–0 friendly win against Cameroon.

Career statistics

International

References

External links
 
 Player profile  at footofeminin.fr
 

1998 births
Living people
Women's association football goalkeepers
French women's footballers
France women's youth international footballers
France women's international footballers
Division 1 Féminine players
Division 2 Féminine players
AS Saint-Étienne (women) players
FC Girondins de Bordeaux (women) players
UEFA Women's Euro 2022 players